Boris Vieru (2 July 1957 – 20 February 2019) was a Moldovan politician.

He worked for Literatura şi Arta (1988–1990). In 1998, Boris Vieru founded Chişinău office of the Radio Free Europe station. He had been a member of the Parliament of Moldova since 2009 until 2014.

References

External links 
 Boris VIERU
 Site-ul Parlamentului Republicii Moldova
 Site-ul Partidului Liberal

1957 births
2019 deaths
People from Rîșcani District
Moldova State University alumni
Radio Free Europe/Radio Liberty people
Moldovan journalists
Male journalists
Liberal Party (Moldova) MPs
Moldovan MPs 2009–2010
Moldovan MPs 2009